Aleksander Metusala (1891–?) was an Estonian politician. He was a member of II Riigikogu. He was a member of the Riigikogu since 22 November 1924. He replaced Eduard Luts.

References

1891 births
Year of death missing
Workers' United Front politicians
Estonian Independent Socialist Workers' Party politicians
Estonian Socialist Workers' Party politicians
Members of the Riigikogu, 1923–1926